Pavoclinus smalei, the Deep-reef klipfish, is a species of clinid currently only known to exist near the mouth of the Storms River in South Africa where it was found over gravel substrates at depths of from .  This species can reach a length of  TL. The name honours the author  Malcolm J. Smale.

References

External links
 Drawing

smalei
Fish described in 1986